Relative Pitch Records is an American independent record label specializing in free jazz and avant-garde jazz, free improvisation, and experimental music. Run by Kevin Reilly, Relative Pitch has been ranked among the top jazz record labels in The New York City Jazz Record and DownBeat year-end lists, and praised by publications and organizations including The Guardian, NPR Music, The Brooklyn Rail, and in Bandcamp Daily's label profile, "Relative Pitch is Built on Enthusiasm for Experimental Music".

History 

Co-founders Kevin Reilly and Mike Panico first met waiting in line at a show and later spent time together as volunteers at The Stone, an experimental music space then located in the East Village. They eventually decided to start a record label, and co-founded Relative Pitch in 2011.

Both Reilly and Panico attended a large number of avant-jazz performances, as noted by many of the label's artists. In a 2013 feature, Mary Halvorson asserted that “What Kevin and Mike share is an unrelenting dedication to and passion for music, which is evident from the sheer number of concerts they attend";  said, "what makes [Relative Pitch] so special in my mind, is that the people that run the label are faces in the crowd of 90% of the shows you play in New York", and described the two as "missionary in their desire to get the music they think is transcendent out to people that don't have the chance or impetus to go to six or seven shows a week in Brooklyn". They traveled to see shows as well, and the label's roster includes both local and international artists; Reilly has said, "I like the idea that you could look at our catalogue and not know where the label is based".

In 2018, Panico's body was found in Flushing Bay; his death was ruled a suicide. A memorial concert was held at Brooklyn performing arts space Roulette, with performances by a number of artists on the Relative Pitch label. Reilly took over operations following Panico's death.

Reception 

The Guardian has described Relative Pitch as "a label whose roster is the perfect place to start if you're looking to take the pulse of the best jazz and improv players currently on the scene". NPR Music has called Relative Pitch "a small label that has made a big impact in avant-garde and free-improv circles", saying its roster "includes some of the most acclaimed artists in the style [of avant-garde jazz], like guitarists Mary Halvorson and Susan Alcorn; bassists Joëlle Léandre and Michael Bisio; and saxophonists Evan Parker, Vinny Golia and Matana Roberts". The publication also noted Matthew Shipp, Bill Frisell, Ingrid Laubrock, Tom Rainey, and Kirk Knuffke as among the "dozens of prominent artists who have released albums on the label".

Wooley invited cofounder Reilly to contribute to "The Listeners Issue" of the journal Sound American, describing him as "represent[ing] a model of listening: the critical audience member" who "approaches every concert and, as you will see, every recording with the rigor of an academic and the intensity of a man possessed".

Notable releases 

The annual NPR Music Jazz Critics Poll has included Mary Halvorson's Reverse Blue (2014), James Brandon Lewis's An UnRuly Manifesto (2019), and the Susan Alcorn Quintet's Pedernal (2020). Lewis's An UnRuly Manifesto was also included in year-end lists in JazzTimes, The New York City Jazz Record, and DownBeat; the New York Times counted Alcorn's Pedernal in their Best Jazz Albums of 2020.

Along with Lewis, many Relative Pitch releases have received a top rating in DownBeat: Continuum (2012) by Book of Three, the trio of Taylor Ho Bynum, John Hébert, and Gerald Cleaver; Greg Cohen's Golden State (2014); Evan Parker and Sylvie Courvoisier's Either Or And (2015); Courvoisier and Halvorson's Crop Circles (2017); and John Butcher's Last Dream Of The Morning (2018).

Other critically-acclaimed albums include Matthew Shipp and Michael Bisio's Floating Ice (2012); Jemeel Moondoc's The Zookeeper's House (2014); Tomas Fujiwara's Variable Bets (2014); the Matthew Shipp Trio's Root of Things (2014); Matana Roberts' Always (2015); Halvorson's Reverse Blue (2015); Alcorn's Soledad (2015); Pulverize The Sound, the self-titled debut of trio Peter Evans, Tim Dahl, and Mike Pride (2015); Mette Ramussen and Chris Corsano's All The Ghosts At Once (2015); Bisio and Kirk Knuffke's Row for William O. (2016); The Out Louds, the eponymous debut of trio Halvorson, Fujiwara, and Ben Goldberg (2016); Steph Richards' Fullmoon (2018); Geometry of Caves (2018) and Geometry of Distance (2019), both by the improvisational quartet of Tomeka Reid, Kyoko Kitamura, Taylor Ho Bynum, and Joe Morris; and Gregg Belisle-Chi's ‘Koi’: Performing the Music of Tim Berne (2021). Relative Pitch also released Nate Wooley's quartet project with Laubrock, Matt Moran, and Courvoisier in the albums Battle Pieces (2015), Battle Pieces 2 (2017), and Battle Pieces 4 (2019).

Discography

Relative Pitch Records (RPR)

Relative Pitch Records: Solo Series (RPRSS)

Relative Pitch Records: Digital Only (RPRDL)

References

Experimental music record labels
American jazz record labels
Jazz record labels
American independent record labels
American record labels
Noise music record labels